A Little Bit of Mambo is the debut album by Lou Bega released in 1999, propelled by the success of the single "Mambo No. 5 (A Little Bit of...)".

Track listing

The Japanese edition has "Mambo No. 5 (A Little Bit of...) (Light Mix)" as track 14, featuring Stephen Powell.

French edition track listing

Credits

All music and lyrics by Lou Bega, Zippy Davids, Frank Lio and Donald Fact, except:
Track 1 – Mambo No. 5 (A Little Bit of...): music by Pérez Prado, lyrics by Lou Bega and Zippy Davids;
Track 4 – Can I Tico Tico You: music by Z. Abreu, lyrics by Lou Bega, Zippy Davids, Frank Lio and Donald Fact.

 Vocals: Lou Bega (main performer)
 Producer: Goar B, Frank Lio, Donald Fact
 Guitar: Goar B, Matthias Borst
 Piano: Donald Fact, Frank Lio, Mickey O'Connell
 Electronic keyboard: Donald Fact, Frank Lio
 Brass: Claus Reichstaller, Axel Kuhn, Hans Bettinger, Felice Civitareale, Black II Black
 Organ: Stefan Schrupp
 Harmonica: Christofer Kochs
 Harp: Christofer Kochs, Erik Uher
 Percussion: Zippy Davids
 Background vocals: Zippy Davids
 Audio mastering: Leon Zervos
 Speaking: Lisa Cash, Kai Taschner
 Cover art: Ronald Reinsberg, Stefano Boragno, Gabo, Angelika M. Zwerenz, Lou Bega
 Styling: Angelika M. Zwerenz, Munich

Charts

Weekly charts

Year-end charts

Certifications

References

1999 debut albums
Lou Bega albums